Onychogomphus uncatus, the large pincertail or blue-eyed hook-tailed dragonfly, is a species of dragonflies belonging to the family Gomphidae.

Distribution
This species is present in Belgium, France, Germany, Italy, Spain, Portugal and Switzerland.

Habitat
These dragonflies can be encountered close to running water and lakes.

Description

The eyes are widely separated and bright-blue or gray-blue, never green. The front black line on the side of the thorax does not touch the midline. The yellow collar at the front of the thorax is interrupted by a black bar. It has four cells on the anal triangle of the rear wing, but no yellow line on the 'vertex'. Cercoids are always yellow.

This dragonfly is bigger and rarer than the small pincertail (Onychogomphus forcipatus), but they are rather similar. The two species can be distinguished on the basis of the shape and extension of the black markings, especially on the thorax and on the last abdominal segments.

Biology
Adults of these dragonflies can be found from mid April through late August. Their life cycle lasts about three years.

Gallery

References 

 Schutte, C., P. Schridde & F. Suhling. 1998. Life history patterns of Onychogomphus uncatus (Charpentier) (Anisoptera: Gomphidae). Odonatologica, 27:71-86.
 Suhling, F. 1995. Temporal patterns of emergence of the riverine dragonfly Onychogomphus uncatus (Odonata: Gomphidae). Hydrobiologia, 302:113-118
 Manuel Ferreras-Romero; Philip S. Corbet - Seasonal patterns of emergence in Odonata of a permanent stream in Southwestern Europe Aquatic Insects: International Journal of Freshwater Entomology Volume 17, Issue 2, 1995, Pages 123 - 127

Gomphidae
Insects described in 1840
Dragonflies of Europe
Taxa named by Toussaint de Charpentier